Lake Beautiful is a lake on Vancouver Island at the head of the Cruikshank River, on Forbidden Plateau in Strathcona Provincial Park.

References

Alberni Valley
Beautiful
Comox Land District